Clonia or Kloniê (Ancient Greek: Κλονιη from kloneô "wildly-rushing") is a nymph in Greek mythology, consort of Hyrieus. By her, he became the father of Nycteus and Lycus.

References 

 Klonie (Clonia) at theoi.com

Nymphs